Malik Sohail Khan Kamrial is a Pakistani politician who has been a member of the National Assembly of Pakistan since October 2018.

Political career
Khan was elected to the National Assembly of Pakistan as a candidate of Pakistan Muslim League (N) (PML-N) from Constituency NA-56 (Attock-II) in 2018 Pakistani by-elections held on 14 October 2018.

Bogus cheque case 
A case had been filed against the PML-N lawmaker at Model Town police station on January 29 for giving a bogus cheque. Khan fled from the local court in Gujranwala after the cancellation of bail in Rs. 60 million bogus cheque case on February 24, 2022.

References

Living people
Pakistan Muslim League (N) MNAs
Pakistani MNAs 2018–2023
Year of birth missing (living people)